Quality Chemicals Limited (QCL) is a Ugandan pharmaceutical, life sciences, and distribution company. The company was formed in 1997,  specializing at first in the importation of generic human and veterinary medication. Its headquarters are located on Katwe Road, in the neighborhood known as Katwe in Makindye Division in the southern part of Kampala, Uganda's capital and largest city.

Quality Chemical Industries Limited

In 2003, discussions began between QCL and the Indian pharmaceutical company Cipla, with the blessing of the Government of Uganda, to establish a joint-venture company in Uganda that would manufacture triple therapy anti retroviral drugs and double therapy antimalarial medication for use in Uganda and nearby countries. Quality Chemical Industries Limited was registered formally on 10 June 2005, with equal shareholding between Cipla and QCL. Later, the Capitalworks International Partnership Fund of South Africa and United Kingdom-based TLG Capital acquired minority shareholding in the joint venture. In 2013, QCL ceded 14.45 percent shareholding to Cipla, making the Indian pharmaceutical company the majority shareholder. The name of the company was changed to Cipla Quality Chemical Industries Limited to reflect the new ownership structure.

Ownership
The shareholding in the stock of Quality Chemicals Limited included the six shareholders who founded the business in 1997. In May 2015, Cipla agreed to pay US$30 million for 51 percent shareholding in Quality Chemicals Limited. The transaction was expected to close by July 2015. The shareholding in the company is illustrated in the table below: 

 Note:Totals are slightly off due to rounding

References

Pharmaceutical companies of Uganda
Companies established in 1997
1997 establishments in Uganda
Companies based in Kampala
Health care companies established in 1997